Delavar Kola (also Romanized as Delāvar Kolā; also known as Delāvar Kolā-ye Pā’īn) is a village in Lalehabad Rural District, Lalehabad District, Babol County, Mazandaran Province, Iran. At the 2006 census, its population was 791, in 227 families.

References 

Populated places in Babol County